The qualifying competition for the 1992 CONCACAF Pre-Olympic Tournament determined the three teams for the final tournament.

Preliminary stage

Caribbean Zone

First round 

|}

Second round 

|}

Central American Zone

|}

 Costa Rica were disqualified for fielding overage players.

Intermediary round 
Each zone were granted three spots in the third round. The group winners and the best runner-up qualified for the final round.

Group A

Group B

 Trinidad and Tobago did not report for the match. El Salvador were awarded a 2–0 victory.

Group C

The Haiti v Panama match was not played as Panama withdrew from the competition, and Haiti were already eliminated (they could at best finish second in the group, and were unable to surpass Mexico in the ranking of second-placed teams).

Ranking of second-placed teams

References

CONCACAF Men's Olympic Qualifying Tournament